Winter Summerland is one of the two miniature golf courses at Walt Disney World Resort in Florida along with Fantasia Gardens. It contains two 18 hole courses, one is winter themed and the other is summer themed.

Story
Late one Christmas Eve Santa was flying back to the North Pole and he discovered snow over Florida. After surveying the situation he decided to make an off duty vacation site for his off-duty elves, a Winter Summerland. Santa decided the only thing it was missing was a golf course. He split his elves into two camps, one that enjoyed the Florida Sun and the other which enjoyed the snow and cold of the North Pole. The camps built two distinctly different 18 Hole Golf Courses, a sand course named "Summer" and a snow course named "Winter".

Location
It is located near the entrance of Blizzard Beach. It is open from 10 am to 11 pm daily. A small selection of beverages (water, soda, juice & beer) & snacks (chips & candy), as well as golf-related merchandise are available for purchase. Small lockers are available and there is a refund when the key is returned.
Opened March 1999
Both the Winter and Summer sides have a record of 25

See also
Fantasia Gardens

References

http://www.allearsnet.com/btp/golf2.htm

Walt Disney World
Miniature golf
Walt Disney Parks and Resorts attractions